Chelifera is a genus of flies in the family Empididae.

Species

C. accomodata Wagner, Leese & Panesar, 2004
C. alpina Vaillant, 1981
C. angusta Collin, 1927
C. aperticauda Collin, 1927
C. apicata Collin, 1928
C. astigma Collin, 1927
C. bakra (Smith, 1965)
C. banski Melander, 1947
C. barbarica Vaillant, 1981
C. berdeni Vaillant, 1978
C. bidenta MacDonald, 1994
C. brevidigitata Wagner, Leese & Panesar, 2004
C. caliga Lavallee, 1975
C. chvalai Wagner, 1984
C. circinata MacDonald, 1994
C. cirrata Melander, 1947
C. concinnicauda Collin, 1927
C. corsicana Vaillant, 1981
C. curvata Wagner, Leese & Panesar, 2004
C. defecta (Loew, 1862)
C. detestata (Meunier, 1908)
C. digitata Wagner, Leese & Panesar, 2004
C. diversicauda Collin, 1927
C. emeishanica Horvat, 2002
C. ensifera Melander, 1947
C. erecta Collin, 1927
C. fascipennis (Meijere, 1913)
C. flavella (Zetterstedt, 1838)
C. fontinalis (Miller, 1923)
C. freemanni Vaillant, 1978
C. frigelii (Zetterstedt, 1838)
C. giraudae Vaillant, 1981
C. haeselbarthae Wagner, Leese & Panesar, 2004
C. incisa Saigusa & Yang, 2003
C. insueta Wagner, Leese & Panesar, 2004
C. khemisiana Vaillant & Gagneur, 1998
C. knutsoni Lavallee, 1975
C. kozaneki Wagner, 2003
C. lapponica Frey, 1950
C. lateralis Yang & Yang, 1995
C. lovetti Melander, 1947
C. macedonica Wagner & Niesiolowski, 1987
C. malickyi Horvat, 2002
C. mana Lavallee, 1975
C. mantiformis (Cuvier, 1795)
C. monostigma (Meigen, 1822)
C. multidenta MacDonald, 1994
C. multiseta Wagner, Leese & Panesar, 2004
C. multisetoides Wagner, Leese & Panesar, 2004
C. nanlingensis Yang, Grootaert & Horvat, 2005
C. neangusta MacDonald, 1994
C. notata (Loew, 1862)
C. nubecula (Becker, 1908)
C. obscura Vaillant, 1968
C. obsoleta (Loew, 1862)
C. ornamenta Horvat, 2002
C. pallida Vaillant, 1981
C. palloris (Coquillett, 1895)
C. pectinicauda Collin, 1927
C. perlucida Niesiolowski, 1986
C. polonica Wagner & Niesiolowski, 1987
C. precabunda Collin, 1961
C. precatoria (Fallén, 1815)
C. prectoria (Fallén, 1816)
C. pyrenaica Vaillant, 1981
C. rastrifera Melander, 1947
C. recurvata (Melander, 1947)
C. rhombicercus Wagner, Leese & Panesar, 2004
C. scrotifera Melander, 1947
C. serraticauda Engel, 1939
C. sheni Saigusa & Yang, 2003
C. sinensis Yang & Yang, 1995
C. siveci Wagner, 1984
C. spectra Vaillant, 1981
C. stauderae Wagner, Leese & Panesar, 2004
C. stigmatica (Schiner, 1860)
C. stuprator (Melander, 1947)
C. subangusta Collin, 1961
C. subensifera MacDonald, 1994
C. subnotata MacDonald, 1994
C. tacita Collin, 1928
C. tantula Collin, 1928
C. thaica Horvat, 2002
C. trapezina (Zetterstedt, 1838)
C. valida (Loew, 1862)
C. varix Melander, 1947
C. vicina (Wagner, 2003)
C. vockerothi Vaillant & Chvála, 1973
C. wagneri Horvat, 1990

References

Empidoidea genera
Empididae
Taxa named by Pierre-Justin-Marie Macquart